Lambros Honos (Greek: Lampros Chonos, Λάμπρος Χώνος) (born 16 February 1983) is a Greek Australian footballer playing for Bentleigh Greens in the National Premier Leagues Victoria.

Club career
Honos began his career as a junior at Port Melbourne SC before heading to Greece to start his senior career. 
After several years in the lower divisions, he then joined Egaleo F.C. ahead of the 2005-06 Alpha Ethniki season where he made 5 appearances in the Greek top-flight.

Following this, Honos spent the next three seasons in the Football League (Greece) with Niki Volos F.C., Ilisiakos F.C., Kallithea F.C. and Ethnikos Piraeus F.C.

After several more years in lower divisions he returned to Australia in 2012 and trialled with Melbourne Heart Football Club before eventually joining NPL Victoria club Oakleigh Cannons FC during the mid-season transfer window. In 2013 Honos switched to Port Melbourne and polled the second-most votes in the Gold Medal award behind Marijan Cvitkovic. In the final game of the 2014 season, Honos set up a Conor Reddan goal in the final minute to save Port Melbourne from relegation. After returning to Oakleigh for the 2015 season, Honos re-joined Port Melbourne for 2016. In June 2016, Honos made a mid-season switch to Bentleigh Greens SC

Personal life
His older brother John Honos is a goalkeeper and they have previously been teammates at Oakleigh Cannons.

References

1983 births
Living people
Soccer players from Melbourne
Australian people of Greek descent
Australian expatriate soccer players
Super League Greece players
National Premier Leagues players
Port Melbourne SC players
Association football midfielders
Australian soccer players
Expatriate footballers in Greece
Australian expatriate sportspeople in Greece
Egaleo F.C. players
Niki Volos F.C. players
Kalamata F.C. players
Ilisiakos F.C. players
Ethnikos Piraeus F.C. players
Kallithea F.C. players
Oakleigh Cannons FC players
Bentleigh Greens SC players
Northcote City FC players
P.A.S. Korinthos players